The Aboriginal Multi-Media Society (AMMSA) is an Aboriginal publisher in Canada dedicated to serving the needs of Aboriginal people throughout Canada. AMMSA was established in 1983 under the Alberta Societies Act and launched its first publication in March 1983 – simply titled AMMSA. The name of this publication was later changed to Windspeaker in March 1986.

Mission
The Aboriginal Multi-Media Society is an independent Indigenous communications organization committed to facilitating the exchange of information reflecting Indigenous culture to a growing and diverse audience.

AMMSA is dedicated to providing objective, mature and balanced coverage of news, information and entertainment relevant to Indigenous issues and peoples while maintaining profound respect for the values, principles and traditions of Indigenous people.

Publications
Not an organization to shy away from embracing technology, AMMSA abandoned the limitations of producing paper products, making the decision to increase its outreach to readers through a new website at Windspeaker.com  More news with no subscription costs for readers.

History

AMMSA published a number of monthly publications listed below 
 Windspeaker – Featuring national content; publishing from March 1983 - 2016

AMMSA published the following provincial publications on a monthly basis:
 Alberta Sweetgrass – News and events from Indigenous communities in Alberta
Published monthly from December 1993 - 2016
 Ontario Birchbark - News and events from Indigenous communities in Ontario
Published monthly from January 2000 -2016
 Raven's Eye - News and events from Indigenous communities in British Columbia and the Yukon
Published monthly from March 1997 - 2016
 Saskatchewan Sage - News and events from Indigenous communities in Saskatchewan
Published monthly from October 1996 - 2016

AMMSA digitized all of the published articles in its paper products dating back to 1983 and makes them available online as part of an archive of 20,000+ news and information articles. These archives have grown to more than 30,000 articles.  Available at AMMSA.com

Radio
AMMSA also operates a radio network, Windspeaker Radio , for Indigenous listeners throughout Alberta. The network studios were originally in Lac La Biche, but are now based in Edmonton. A new transmitter in Edmonton was licensed by the CRTC in 2008, and became the CFWE network's primary station when it launched in July 2009.

On June 14, 2017, the CRTC granted AMMSA licenses to operate Type B Native FM radio stations aimed at urban Indigenous audiences in Edmonton at 89.3 MHz as the Raven CIWE-FM (which signed on in 2021), and in Calgary at 88.1 MHz as CJWE-FM (which began broadcasting in 2018). Both frequencies were previously licensed to Aboriginal Voices Radio Network but were revoked in 2015 due to compliance issues.

References

External links
 

 AMMSA History

First Nations mass media
Magazine publishing companies of Canada
Radio broadcasting companies of Canada
Companies based in Edmonton
Indigenous broadcasting in Canada